Heads of Ayr railway station was a railway station serving the Heads of Ayr, South Ayrshire, Scotland. The station was part of the Maidens and Dunure Light Railway.

History
The station opened on 17 May 1906. It closed on 1 December 1930 and reopened on 4 July 1932 when a holiday camp was opened in the Heads of Ayr, however it closed again on 1 June 1933. Upon the opening of a Butlins holiday camp in the area, a new Heads of Ayr Holiday Camp station was opened a mile east of this station on 17 May 1947. and closed on 16th Sept 1968

References

Notes

Sources
  
 
 
 Article in British Railway Journal No 8 Summer 1985 Wild Swan Publications

Disused railway stations in South Ayrshire
Railway stations in Great Britain opened in 1906
Railway stations in Great Britain closed in 1930
Railway stations in Great Britain opened in 1932
Railway stations in Great Britain closed in 1933
Former Glasgow and South Western Railway stations
Railway stations in Ayr